A list of films produced in Spain in 1955 (see 1955 in film).

1955

References

External links
 Spanish films of 1955 at the Internet Movie Database

1955
Spanish
Films